= Ust-Manya =

Ust-Manya Усть-Манья
- Derevnya
- Interactive map of Ust-Manya
- Country: Russia
- Autonomous okrug: Khanty-Mansi Autonomous Okrug

Ust-Manya is a village in the Berezovsky District of the Khanty-Mansiysk Autonomous Okrug — Yugra Rossii. It is part of the Hulimskunt rural settlement.Ust-Manya is a village in the Berezovsky District of the Khanty-Mansiysk Autonomous Okrug — Yugra Rossii. The village has one street - Beregovaya.

== Geography ==
The village is located on the left bank of the Severnaya Sosiva river, in the area where it flows into the Manya river, at a distance of 307 km (in a straight line) to the south-west from the city-type village of Berezovo, the administrative center of the district.

=== Climate ===
The climate is sharply continental. The winter is harsh with strong winds and blizzards, lasting seven months. Summer is relatively warm, but fast.

== Population ==
In 1989, the village had 47 residents, while from 2002 to 2021, the population decreased from 39 residents in 2002 to 18 residents in 2021.
